Kyle McCulloch (born November 11, 1962) is a Canadian writer for the TV cartoon South Park, and is largely responsible for the show's Canadian culture themes. He will also occasionally provide the voice for one-time use characters, such as Gary Harrison in "All About Mormons". He was a story editor and writer on SpongeBob SquarePants. He wrote one episode in season 4, and wrote "A Day Like This" song for the 10th anniversary special Truth or Square. He returned to work on the show in season 9, but left again to work on Lady Dynamite. He was set to make his feature film debut writing and directing The SpongeBob Movie: Sponge on the Run along with Paul Tibbitt, who was originally set to return to direct the film, but they were later replaced by The SpongeBob SquarePants Movie writer, Tim Hill.

Born in Regina, Saskatchewan, McCulloch is also the voice and creator of Mr. Wong in the online cartoon series at icebox.com.
The son of retired CBC Radio announcer Tom McCulloch, Kyle grew up in Winnipeg, Manitoba, and started his career acting in Guy Maddin films such as Archangel, Careful, and Tales from the Gimli Hospital. In 1990, he performed in his own play at the Winnipeg Fringe Festival.

Filmography

Television

References

External links 
 

1962 births
Living people
Canada–United States relations in South Park
Canadian male screenwriters
Canadian television writers
Writers from Regina, Saskatchewan
21st-century Canadian screenwriters